In calculus, the derivative of any linear combination of functions equals the same linear combination of the derivatives of the functions; this property is known as linearity of differentiation, the rule of linearity, or the superposition rule for differentiation. It is a fundamental property of the derivative that encapsulates in a single rule two simpler rules of differentiation, the sum rule (the derivative of the sum of two functions is the sum of the derivatives) and the constant factor rule (the derivative of a constant multiple of a function is the same constant multiple of the derivative). Thus it can be said that differentiation is linear, or the differential operator is a linear operator.

Statement and derivation
Now consider

By the sum rule in differentiation, this is

and by the constant factor rule in differentiation, this reduces to

Therefore,

Omitting the brackets, this is often written as:

Detailed proofs/derivations from definition
We can prove the entire linearity principle at once, or, we can prove the individual steps (of constant factor and adding) individually. Here, both will be shown.

Proving linearity directly also proves the constant factor rule, the sum rule, and the difference rule as special cases. One could also define both the second constant coefficient and the second function to be 0, where the domain of the second function is a superset of the first function, among other possibilities.)

On the contrary, if we first prove the constant factor rule and the sum rule, we can prove linearity and the difference rule. Proving linearity is done by defining the first and second functions as being two other functions being multiplied by constant coefficients. Then, as shown in the derivation from the previous section, we can first use the sum law while differentiation, and then use the constant factor rule, which will reach our conclusion for linearity. This would, when simplified, give us the difference rule for differentiation.

Linearity (directly)
Let . Let  be functions. Let .

We want to prove that .

By definition, we can see that

In order to use the limits law for the sum of limits, we need to know that  and  both individually exist. For these smaller limits, we need to know that  and  both individually exist to use the coefficient law for limits. So, if we know that  and  both exist, we will know that  and  both individually exist. This allows us to use the coefficient law for limits to write

and

With this, we can go back to apply the limit law for the sum of limits, since we know that  and  both individually exist. From here, we can directly go back to the derivative we were working on.Finally, we have shown what we claimed in the beginning: .

Sum
Let  be functions.
Let .

We want to prove that .

By definition, we can see that

In order to use the law for the sum of limits here, we need to show that the individual limits,  and  both exist. So, assuming that the derivatives exist, we can continue the above derivation

Thus, we have shown what we wanted to show, that: .

Difference
Let  be functions. Let .

We want to prove that .

By definition, we can see that:

In order to use the law for the difference of limits here, we need to show that the individual limits,  and  both exist. By definition,  and that , so these limits exist whenever the derivatives  and  exist. So, assuming that the derivatives exist, we can continue the above derivation

Thus, we have shown what we wanted to show, that: .

Constant coefficient
Let  be a function. Let ;  will be the constant coefficient. Let  be a function, where j is defined only where  is defined. Let .

We want to prove that .

By definition, we can see that:

Now, in order to use a limit law for constant coefficients to show that

 we need to show that  exists.
However, by the definition of the derivative. So, if  exists, then   exists.

Thus, if we assume that  exists, we can use the limit law and continue our proof.

Thus, we have proven that when , we have .

See also

References

Articles containing proofs
Differential calculus
Differentiation rules
Theorems in analysis
Theorems in calculus